Zerti is a village in the Lachin District of Azerbaijan. It famous locally for sheep skin producing.

References 

Populated places in Lachin District